Avery is a ghost town in Lincoln County, Oklahoma, United States.  The community had a post office from September 16, 1902, until August 26, 1957.  Founded as Mound City, it was renamed for Eastern Oklahoma Railway worker Avery Turner after the railroad built through the community.

References

External links
Avery - Ghost Town
 Oklahoma Digital Maps: Digital Collections of Oklahoma and Indian Territory
"Ghost town of Avery, Oklahoma." Accessed February 2, 2017.

Ghost towns in Oklahoma
Populated places in Lincoln County, Oklahoma